Berisad Glacier is a glacier  long and  wide in Veregava Ridge, central Sentinel Range in Ellsworth Mountains, Antarctica. It flows north-northwestwards from Kushla Peak to join Dater Glacier northeast of Sipey Bluff.

The glacier is named after the Thracian king Berisad, 358-352 BC.

Location
US mapping in 1961, updated in 1988.

See also
 List of glaciers in the Antarctic
 Glaciology

Maps
 Vinson Massif.  Scale 1:250 000 topographic map.  Reston, Virginia: US Geological Survey, 1988.
 Antarctic Digital Database (ADD). Scale 1:250000 topographic map of Antarctica. Scientific Committee on Antarctic Research (SCAR). Since 1993, regularly updated.

Notes

References
 Bulgarian Antarctic Gazetteer. Antarctic Place-names Commission. (details in Bulgarian, basic data in English)

External links
 Berisad Glacier. Copernix satellite image

Glaciers of Ellsworth Land
Bulgaria and the Antarctic